Edward Donald MacArthur (February 7, 1920 – June 29, 1986) was a Canadian politician. He represented the electoral district of Kings West in the Nova Scotia House of Assembly from 1960 to 1963. He was a member of the Nova Scotia Liberal Party.

MacArthur was born in 1920 at Pictou, Nova Scotia. He was educated at Dalhousie University, and was a physician by career. MacArthur entered provincial politics in the 1960 election, winning the Kings West riding by 512 votes. He was defeated by Progressive Conservative Paul Kinsman when he ran for re-election in 1963. MacArthur died in 1986.

References

1920 births
1986 deaths
Dalhousie University alumni
Nova Scotia Liberal Party MLAs
People from Kings County, Nova Scotia
People from Pictou County